Shabwah is a governorate (province) of Yemen.  Its main town is Ataq.

During the Yemeni Civil War in 2015, the province became a battleground. The battle, known as the Shabwah Campaign, ended on August 15, 2015, after forces loyal to the government of Abd Rabbah Mansour Hadi defeated Houthi rebels.

Geography

Adjacent governorates

 Hadhramaut Governorate (north, east)
 Abyan Governorate (south)
 Al Bayda Governorate (west)
 Marib Governorate (north, west)

Districts
Shabwah Governorate is divided into the following 17 districts. These districts are further divided into sub-districts, and then further subdivided into villages:

 Ain District
 Al Talh District
 Ar Rawdah District
 Arma District
 As Said District
 Ataq District
 Bayhan District
 Dhar District
 Habban District
 Hatib District
 Jardan District
 Mayfa'a District
 Merkhah Al Ulya District
 Merkhah As Sufla District
 Nisab District
 Rudum District
 Usaylan District

References 

 
Governorates of Yemen